Pol is a Bantu language of Cameroon. Pol proper is spoken in central Cameroon; the Pomo and Kweso dialects are spoken in Congo and the CAR near the Cameroonian border.

Demographics
Polri Asóm, the southernmost dialect of the Polri language in Bertoua commune, is found in Dimako commune, in proximity with Kwakum.

The Asóm claim to understand Kinda and vice versa. Kwakum speakers also claim to understand Polri Asóm.

Polri Asóm is spoken in nine villages: four to the east of Doumé (commune of Dimako, department of Haut-Nyong, Eastern Region) and five to the north of Bertoua (south of Pol Canton in the commune of Bélabo, department of Lom-et-Djerem, Eastern Region).

Polri Kinda is spoken in three villages: Mambaya to the north, as well as Mansa and Ona. The Asóm dialect should not be confused with the Asón dialect of Bébil.

Polri is also spoken in the Republic of Congo. In Cameroon, there 38,676 speakers.

References

Languages of Cameroon
Pomo–Bomwali languages